Victor Gabriel Ehrenberg (22 August 1851 – 10 March 1929) was a German jurist.

Biography
Ehrenberg was born in Wolfenbüttel, Duchy of Brunswick. He was the son of a Jewish couple, Philipp Samuel Ehrenberg and Julie Fischel, Principal of the Samson School in Wolfenbüttel. After gymnasium in Wolfenbüttel he studied legal science in Göttingen, Leipzig, Heidelberg and Freiburg. His brothers were Otto Ehrenberg and Richard Ehrenberg.

He gave lectures at the Universities of Göttingen (from 1877), Rostock (1882), again Göttingen (1888) and then Leipzig (1911–1922).

Ehrenberg married Elise Marie A. Helene von Jhering (1852–1920), daughter of the legal historian Rudolf von Jhering (1818–1892). Ehrenberg died in Göttingen on 10 March 1929.

His son  was professor of physiology and medicine at the University of Göttingen and his daughter Hedwig Martha Ehrenberg (1891–1972) married scientist Max Born.

Ehrenberg was a great-grandfather of Australian singer and actress Olivia Newton-John, an uncle of historian Victor Ehrenberg, a great-uncle of physicist and education researcher Lewis Elton and of historian Geoffrey Elton, and a great-great uncle of comedian and writer Ben Elton.

Works
 Versicherungsgeschichte, 1893
 Die deutsche Rechtsgeschichte und die juristische Bildung, 1894

References

External links

 
 Moller at www.lib.hit-u.ac.jp (about his books)
 CGJS: Elton / Ehrenberg at www.sussex.ac.uk (about pedigree, historian V. Ehrenberg, etc.)
 pdf (German)
 pdf (German)

1851 births
1929 deaths
People from Wolfenbüttel
People from the Duchy of Brunswick
19th-century German Jews
Jurists from Lower Saxony
Academic staff of the University of Rostock
Academic staff of the University of Göttingen
Academic staff of Leipzig University
19th-century German lawyers

Ehrenberg family